Hand of God may refer to:

Religion and spirituality 
Act of God, in religious or legal contexts
Hand of God (art), a motif in Jewish and Christian art
Hands of God, a symbol in Polish Neopaganism

Arts and media 
Hand of God (film), a 2006 documentary
Hand of God (TV series)
"Hand of God (Outro)", a song by Jon Bellion from The Human Condition
"Hand of God" by Soundgarden from Screaming Life
"Hand of God", a song by Randy Stonehill from Thirst
"The Hand of God" (1978 Battlestar Galactica)
"The Hand of God" (2004 Battlestar Galactica)
The Hand of God (book), an autobiographical book by Bernard N. Nathanson
The Hand of God (Carl Milles), Carl Milles's statue located at Frank Murphy Hall of Justice
The Hand of God (film), a 2021 Italian drama film

Sports 
The hand of God, a controversial goal in the 1986 Argentina v England FIFA World Cup match
"(Le) Hand of God", a controversial goal in the second match of a 2009 two-legged play-off in Paris

Other uses 
PSR B1509-58, a pulsar whose surroundings resemble a hand, nicknamed the "Hand of God"
Hand of God is a bronze hand found by archaeologists at Roman ruins

See also 
God Hand, a 2006 video game
Hamsa or Khamsa, a hand-shaped protective amulet in Islamic and Jewish folklore also known as "(God's) helping hand"
Right hand of God 
Left Hand of God (disambiguation)
God Hand (disambiguation)
Finger of God (disambiguation)